Peter Hugh Dennis (born 13 February 1962) is an English comedian, presenter, actor, impressionist, and writer. He is perhaps best known for appearing as a panellist in every episode of the comedy show Mock the Week (2005–2022). He has also appeared in the comedy double act Punt and Dennis with Steve Punt and played Dr. Piers Crispin in the sitcom My Hero (2000–2006), Pete Brockman in the sitcom Outnumbered (2007–2016), Toby in the sitcom Not Going Out (2014–present), and the Bank Manager in the first season of the comedy-drama series Fleabag (2016). He presents the community archaeology television show The Great British Dig (2020–present).

Early life
Peter Hugh Dennis was born in Kettering on 13 February 1962, the son of schoolteacher Dorothy Mary (née Hinnels) and Anglican priest John Dennis. His older brother, John Jr., is a diplomat who has served as the British Ambassador to Angola and the British Representative to Taiwan. He grew up in the Mill Hill suburb of London as his father was appointed vicar of the local John Keble Church soon after his birth. His father later became the Bishop of Knaresborough and then the Bishop of St Edmundsbury and Ipswich.

Dennis was educated at private University College School in London. During his time at UCS, he played rugby with Will Self and was head boy in his final year. He went on to read for the Geographical Tripos as an exhibitioner at St John's College, Cambridge. His thesis was titled "The Spatial Distribution of Elementary Education in 19th-century Wakefield". He also joined the Footlights, where he first met Steve Punt and club president Nick Hancock, and the trio collaborated on a number of projects besides the annual revue. In 2016, Dennis said that he was approached by MI5 agents whilst at Cambridge University and attended a preliminary interview to join them; however, he eventually decided that he did not want to take the matter any further, particularly due to being told during the interview that the job would require him to "do people over".

After graduating with a first, Dennis worked for Unilever for six years in the marketing department while performing comedy with Punt at venues including The Comedy Store in London at weekends. Whilst at Unilever, Dennis became a brand manager of Lynx deodorant. His time at Unilever came to an end when he and Punt had their BBC Radio 1 show The Mary Whitehouse Experience, which they had created alongside David Baddiel and Rob Newman, commissioned for BBC Two. Dennis was put on sabbatical by Unilever, as rehearsals for the show were to take place on a weekday, but he never returned to the company and instead chose to pursue comedy full-time as a result of the show's success.

Dennis uses his middle name Hugh as his stage name because the actor Peter Dennis was already a member of the performing arts union Equity. He later revealed in a 2016 episode of BBC's Would I Lie to You? that he had requested to keep his birth name as there was little chance of confusion between the two actors due to their age difference. Equity told him that this would normally have been allowed, but advised against it as Peter Dennis was the chair of the union's naming committee at the time.

Career

As an impressionist, Dennis did voices for Spitting Image and appeared with Punt as resident support comics on two TV series hosted on the BBC by Jasper Carrott. Dennis also appeared twice as a contestant on the topical panel show Have I Got News for You, including one opposite former schoolmate Self.

Punt and Dennis' radio career includes over a decade of performing Punt and Dennis, It's Been a Bad Week, The Party Line and the satirical radio comedy show, The Now Show. On The Now Show, Dennis was originally in a line-up including Punt, Mitch Benn, Laura Shavin, Jon Holmes and Marcus Brigstocke. He is friends with Chris Morris and has had cameos on Brass Eye as well as doing the narration for the CBBC show Sam and Mark's Guide to Dodging Disaster.

In December 2009, Dennis joined Oz Clarke in presenting the 60-minute Christmas special Oz and Hugh Drink to Christmas broadcast on BBC Two. In December 2010 the pair returned for a four-part series called Oz and Hugh Raise the Bar, which puts them in a competition to create a bar featuring only local British food and drinks.

Dennis has starred in a number of sitcoms, including My Hero, in which he played obnoxious GP Piers Crispin. From 2007 to 2014, he starred in Outnumbered, a semi-improvised sitcom based around family life and won a BAFTA nomination in the comedy category for the 2009 Christmas special. On Radio 4 he also featured in the sitcom Revolting People which, like Outnumbered, was co-written by Andy Hamilton.

Besides his regular television work, Dennis is a panellist on Mock the Week and has appeared in all episodes since its premiere in 2005, with the exception of a special episode of the programme that was broadcast as part of David Walliams' 24 Hour Panel People. He is a regular guest on various BBC-broadcast comedy panel game shows such as They Think It's All Over, Would I Lie To You?, QI and has guest hosted Have I Got News for You. In 2011, Dennis hosted the short-lived improvisational comedy series Fast and Loose.

Beginning on 16 February 2012, Dennis and Julia Bradbury hosted a four-part BBC One documentary series The Great British Countryside. From October 2014, Dennis has started appearing in the sitcom Not Going Out as Toby.

In 2016, Dennis appeared as the Bank Manager in the BBC Three series Fleabag, acting alongside Phoebe Waller-Bridge in the first, fourth, and final episodes of series 1.

In February 2021, Dennis started presenting The Great British Dig on More 4.

In the September 2021, Bond film No Time to Die, Dennis cameoed as a scientist in an MI6 laboratory.

Personal life
Dennis lives in London, having previously lived near Chichester. He married Miranda Carroll in 1987 and they divorced in 1993. He married Catherine "Kate" Abbot-Anderson in 1996, and they had a son and a daughter before divorcing in 2015. In June 2018, it was confirmed that he was in a relationship with his Outnumbered co-star Claire Skinner.

Dennis is a supporter of Arsenal FC, a fellow of the Royal Geographical Society, and a member of the Cloud Appreciation Society. He took part in the 2007 L'Étape du Tour, cycling an open stage of the Tour de France for amateurs which was held in the mountains two weeks before the main event, and completed it in 11 hours and 7 minutes.

In 2008, Dennis received an Honorary fellowship from the University of Northampton.

In 2011, Dennis completed the Great South Run in Portsmouth for the Alzheimer's Society.

Filmography

Accolades

References

Citations

External links

 

Alumni of St John's College, Cambridge
English comedy writers
English male comedians
English male television actors
English satirists
People educated at University College School
People from Kettering
1962 births
British comedy writers
Living people
20th-century English comedians
21st-century English comedians
Comedians from Northamptonshire
People from Mill Hill